The 1998 EA-Generali Ladies Linz was a women's tennis tournament played on indoor carpet courts at the Intersport Arena in Linz, Austria that was part of Tier II of the 1998 WTA Tour. It was the 12th edition of the tournament and was held from 23 February through 1 March 1998. First-seeded Jana Novotná won the singles title.

Finals

Singles

 Jana Novotná defeated  Dominique Van Roost 6–1, 7–6
 It was Novotná's 1st title of the year and the 87th of her career.

Doubles

 Alexandra Fusai /  Nathalie Tauziat defeated  Anna Kournikova /  Larisa Savchenko 6–3, 3–6, 6–4
 It was Fusai's 1st title of the year and the 5th of her career. It was Tauziat's 1st title of the year and the 19th of her career.

External links
 ITF tournament edition details
 WTA tournament profile

EA-Generali Ladies Linz
Linz Open
EA-Generali Ladies Linz
EA-Generali Ladies Linz
EA-Generali Ladies Linz
Generali